George Jackson House may refer to:

in Canada
George Jackson House (Toronto), Ontario

in the United States

George Jackson House (Ridgway, Colorado), listed on the National Register of Historic Places (NRHP) in Ouray County
George W. Jackson House, Baconton, Georgia, NRHP-listed in Mitchell County

See also
Jackson House (disambiguation)